is a Japanese actor and voice actor affiliated with 81 Produce.

Biography

Filmography

Television animation
1980s
Mobile Suit Gundam ZZ (1986) – Nelmarsen
Bravoman (1988) – Bravoman
1990s
Holly the Ghost (1991) – Kakarasu
Otaku no Video (1991) – Yoshida
Soar High! Isami (1995) – Eisuke Yukimi, Sensuke Yukimi, Yoroi Tengu
Yu-Gi-Oh! (1998) - Chief Inspector (ep.2)
Kyorochan (1999) – Don Girori
2000s
Shrine of the Morning Mist (2002) – Naonori Hieda
GetBackers (2003) – Azuma
Zatch Bell! (2005) – Earth
Blood+ – Aston Collins
Death Note (2006) – Narrator, Armonia Jastin Beyondllemason
Naruto (2006) – Amachi
Fullmetal Alchemist: Brotherhood (2009) – Barry the Chopper
Pandora Hearts (2009) – Oscar Vessalius
Umineko no Naku Koro ni (2009) – Sadakichi Kumasawa
2010s
Panty and Stocking with Garterbelt (2010) – Abrams Monkey Lawyer
Hunter × Hunter (2011) (2012) – Battera
Jormungand: Perfect Order (2012) – Nazal
Naruto Shippuden (2012) – Gengetsu Hōzuki/Second Mizukage
One Piece (2014) – Diamante
Gangsta. (2015) – Uranos Corsica
Re:Zero − Starting Life in Another World (2016) – Conwood Melahau
Gabriel DropOut (2017) – Master (ep.3, 7, 11, 12)
Mahojin Guru Guru (2017) – Lithograph (ep.6, 14)
Zoids Wild (2018) – Taifu

Unknown date
Bakugan Battle Brawlers – Naga
Bonobono – Araiguma-kun's father
Cromartie High School – Akira Nakao
Domain of Murder – Tsuyoshi Toyama
Mobile Suit Gundam 00 – Ian Vashti
MÄR – Kannochi
Saru Get You -On Air- – Hakase, Ukki Red
Tenchi Muyo! – Yukinojyo
Toriko – Alfaro

Original video animation
Mutant Turtles: Superman Legend (1996) – Splinter
Mobile Suit Gundam Unicorn (2010) - Hill Dawson
JoJo's Bizarre Adventure (xxxx) - Pilot A

Theatrical animation
6 Angels (2002) - Ed Canyon

Live action
Kousoku Sentai Turboranger (1989-1990, Episodes: 1-51) - Rage Flying Boma Zulten / Zulten Metal Type
Chikyuu Sentai Fiveman (1990, Episodes: 6, 24, 24) - Garoa-don / Enokiraagin / Batzler Soldier No.339
Choujin Sentai Jetman (1991, Episodes: 11, 13-14, 28) - Jihaiki Jigen / Camela Jigen / Dryer Jigen
Chouriki Sentai Ohranger (1996, Episode: 42) - Bara Hunter (uncredited)
Chouriki Sentai Ohranger Movie (1995) - Steam Punkus
Gekisou Sentai Carranger (1996, Episode: 7) - NN Nerenko
Kyukyu Sentai GoGoFive (1999, Episode: 18) - Tactical Psyma Beast Spiderus
Hyakujuu Sentai Gaoranger (2001, Episode: 25) - Karaoke Org
Bakuryuu Sentai Abaranger (2004, Episode: 45) - Trinoid #22: Nanakusarunba
Mahou Sentai Magiranger (2005-2006, Episode: 35-48) - Hades Ultimate God Sleipnir
Juken Sentai Gekiranger (2007-2008, Episode: 36-48) - Mythical Beast Basilisk-Fist Sanyo 
Samurai Sentai Shinkenger (2009, Episode: 7) - Ayakashi Yamiororo

Games
 Rogue Galaxy (2005) - Steve
 Ehrgeiz (1998) - Lee Shuwen
 Super Robot Wars (????) - Vindel Mauser
 Mega Man 11 (2018) - Dr. Wily

Drama CDs
Miscast Series (????) - Masahiro Motoki
Chrno Crusade (????) - Edward Hamilton/Elder

Dubbing

Live-action
 Annie – NY1 Reporter (Pat Kiernan)
 Blood Father – Kirby Curtis (William H. Macy)
 The Dictator – "Nuclear" Nadal (Jason Mantzoukas)
 Dr. Dolittle: Tail to the Chief – Chief Dorian (Malcolm Stewart)
 ER – Paul Nathan (Don Cheadle)
 Escape from L.A. – Map to the Stars Eddie (Steve Buscemi)
 Fathers' Day – Jack Lawrence (Billy Crystal)
 Green Book – Charlie the Pawn Guy (Peter Gabb)
 Harry Potter movies – Arthur Weasley (Mark Williams)
 Hotel Rwanda – Paul Rusesabagina (Don Cheadle)
 Infestation – Ethan (Ray Wise)
 The Island – James McCord (Steve Buscemi)
 Minari – Paul (Will Patton)
 Mission: Impossible – Ghost Protocol – Marek Stefanski (Pavel Kříž)
 Resident Evil: Afterlife – Bennett Sinclair (Kim Coates)
 Shameless – Frank Gallagher (William H. Macy)
 A Star Is Born – Wolfie (Michael Harney)
 Tomb Raider – Terry (Duncan Airlie James)
 Transformers: Age of Extinction – Joshua Joyce (Stanley Tucci)
 Transformers: The Last Knight – Merlin (Stanley Tucci)
 Apollo 13 (2003 Fuji TV edition) – Henry Hurt (Xander Berkeley)
 Dead Ahead: The Exxon Valdez Disaster – Sam Skinner (Kenneth Welsh)
 Die Hard with a Vengeance (1998 Fuji TV edition) – Arab Caddie (Aasif Mandvi)
 Homicide: Life on the Street - John Munch (Richard Belzer)
 Law & Order: Special Victims Unit - John Munch (Richard Belzer)
 The Muppet Christmas Carol - The Great Gonzo, Miss Piggy, Dr. Bunsen Honeydew, Ma Bear
 Muppet Treasure Island - The Great Gonzo, Miss Piggy, Dr. Bunsen Honeydew
 Pompeii – Severus (Jared Harris)
 Pulp Fiction – Buddy Holly (Steve Buscemi)
 Safe House (2018 BS Japan edition) – Alec Wade (Liam Cunningham)

Animation
 Animaniacs – Pinky
 Pinky and the Brain – Pinky
 Batman: the Animated Series – G. Carl Francis
 Bartok the Magnificent – Vol
 Ben 10 - Sublimino
 Brave – The Crow
 Cloudy with a Chance of Meatballs 2 – Chester V
 Duck Dodgers – Narrator, Dr. I.Q. High
 Finding Nemo – Sheldon's dad
 The Grim Adventures of Billy and Mandy – Singing Meteor, Van Helsing
 Hotel Transylvania – Pilot
 Ice Age – Zeke
 The Lion Guard – Zazu
 The Lion King – Zazu
 The Lion King 1½ – Zazu
 The Lion King II: Simba's Pride – Zazu
 Looney Tunes – Wile E. Coyote
 Noddy's Toyland Adventures - Narrator and Sly The Goblin
 Quest for Camelot – Bladebeak
 Recess – Mr. E
 The Batman – Shadow Thief
 The Prince of Egypt – Huy
 The Swan Princess: Escape from Castle Mountain – Bromley
 The Swan Princess: The Mystery of the Enchanted Kingdom – Bromley
 The Simpsons – Artie Ziff
 Teenage Mutant Ninja Turtles – Splinter, Krang
 Teenage Mutant Ninja Turtles III – Splinter
 Teen Titans – Mad Mod
 Thomas & Friends - Skarloey (Season 9 onwards, succeeding Tomohisa Asō)
 Thumbelina – King Colbert
 Titan A.E. – Gune
 Toy Story That Time Forgot – The Cleric
 TUGS - Zak, Burke, Scuttlebutt Pete, Puffa, Jack the Grappler, The Shrimpers
 Ultimate Spider-Man – Grandmaster 
 X-Men – Mojo

References

External links
Official agency profile 
Hideyuki Umezu at the Seiyuu database

1955 births
Living people
Male voice actors from Aichi Prefecture
Japanese male video game actors
Japanese male voice actors
20th-century Japanese male actors
21st-century Japanese male actors
81 Produce voice actors